Klasky-Csupo, Inc. (stylized as KLaSKY CSUPO INC., doing business as Klasky Csupo) is an American animation studio located in Los Angeles, California. It was  founded in 1982 by producer Arlene Klasky and Hungarian animator Gábor Csupó (hence the company's name) in a spare room of their apartment and grew to 550 artists, creative workers and staff in an animation facility in Hollywood.

During the 1990s and 2000s, they produced and animated era-defining shows for the children's network, Nickelodeon, such as Rugrats (which was one of the channel's original animated series, known as Nicktoons), Aaahh!!! Real Monsters, The Wild Thornberrys, Rocket Power, As Told by Ginger and All Grown Up!. They also animated the early seasons of The Simpsons for 20th Century Fox and Gracie Films, as well as Duckman on USA Network. In 2008, Nickelodeon ended their long-running partnership with Klasky Csupo and its shows ceased production, resulting in the company becoming dormant for four years. In 2012, the company reopened and began production on a CGI-animated reboot of Rugrats, which premiered in 2021 on Paramount+, the streaming service of Nickelodeon and its parent company Paramount Global.

History

1982–1991: Early years
Klasky-Csupo, Inc. got its start in 1982. It was founded in the spare bedroom of a Hollywood apartment where Arlene Klasky and Gábor Csupó were living while married. In 1983, Klasky-Csupo expanded and moved to a new location at 729 Seward Street, (Bob Clampetts studio) opening its first facility in Hollywood.

Klasky Csupo was initially distinguished by its work on logo designs, commercials, feature film trailers, TV show titles, promos and ident spots for a wide variety of clients, in the process earning a reputation as the industry's most imaginative and innovative studio. Building on its success, the studio left Seward Street to open its second facility in Hollywood in 1988 at the corner of Fountain and Highland Avenues. The studio soon grew to include six buildings that have become well known in Hollywood—in true Klasky Csupo style, the exterior walls of the buildings are decorated with large murals of its characters.

The studio's first big break came in 1987 when James L. Brooks of Gracie Films commissioned the studio to produce the title sequence for a comedy series titled The Tracey Ullman Show. In addition to the main title, Klasky Csupo was given the opportunity to produce and animate a new series of one-minute cartoons which featured a family called the Simpsons, created by Matt Groening. Klasky Csupo produced and animated all 48 shorts, and when it became one of the most popular segments on the show, Fox began airing a weekly half-hour series entitled The Simpsons. Klasky Csupo oversaw and animated every episode of the first three seasons of the series, resulting in the studio sharing the 1989–1990 and 1990–1991 Primetime Emmy Award for Outstanding Animated Program, with Gracie Films.

In addition, Klasky Csupo produced the hit video "Do the Bartman". Klasky Csupo animator and colorist "Georgie" Gyorgyi Kovacs Peluce (Kovács Györgyike) conceived the idea of The Simpsons characters having yellow skin, and Marge Simpson having blue hair, opting for something which "didn't look like anything that had come before." Klasky Csupo was also responsible for an error during the episode "Homer's Odyssey", in which Waylon Smithers was colorized as black with blue hair.

In 1992, Gracie Films switched domestic production of The Simpsons to Film Roman from 1992 to 2016. Csupó was "asked [by Gracie Films] if they could bring in their own producer [to oversee the animation production]," but declined, stating "they wanted to tell me how to run my business." Sharon Bernstein of The Los Angeles Times wrote that "Gracie executives had been unhappy with the producer Csupo had assigned to The Simpsons and said the company also hoped to obtain better wages and working conditions for animators at Film Roman." Of the 110 people he employed to animate The Simpsons, Csupó laid off 75.

1991–2005: Major success with animated series
In 1991, Klasky Csupo created Rugrats, one of the first animated shows for Nickelodeon - known as "Nicktoons" - which was inspired by the couple's two sons and the idea of what they would do if they could speak. Their next major series was Duckman for the USA Network, which revolved around the home life and adventures of a dim-witted and lascivious private detective duck named Eric Duckman. The series ran from 1994 to 1997. During the same time, Nickelodeon released Klasky Csupo's second Nicktoon series, Aaahh!!! Real Monsters. During this time, Klasky Csupo originally ended production on Rugrats due to the network's since-outdated 65-episode rule. However, when Rugrats went into syndication, it exploded in popularity with ratings skyrocketing and advertising deals taking off, prompting Nickelodeon and Klasky Csupo to resume production on the series. The show was cited as "a show like the Simpsons, but for children".

In 1993, Klasky Csupo worked with comedian Lily Tomlin and her partner Jane Wagner to bring the irascible little girl, Edith Ann, to television in two half-hour animated specials for ABC. The first, A Few Pieces of the Puzzle, aired in January 1994 and received critical acclaim, and the second, Homeless Go Home, aired in May 1994 to even better response and ratings.

In 1995, the studio debuted Santo Bugito, the first Saturday morning animated comedy on television. Created by Arlene Klasky and Gabor Csupo for CBS, Santo Bugito tells the story of a small town of 64,000,000 insects located on the border of Texas and Mexico. Music-driven and Latin-influenced, the series stars Cheech Marin, Joan Van Ark, Tony Plana, William Sanderson, George Kennedy, Marabina Jaimes and David Paymer, and is highlighted by a distinctive look and the music of Mark Mothersbaugh, the Devo keyboardist who also composed the music of Rugrats.

The same year, Klasky Csupo established Klasky Csupo Commercials (rebranded as Class-Key Chew-Po Commercials in 1998) - helmed by John Andrews - in order to continue the successful commercial animation business that had grown from the company's initial work in main titles and graphics. Class-Key Chew-Po had been an immediate success, building an impressive client list with work for companies like 1-800-COLLECT, Oscar Mayer, Taco Bell, Kraft, and Nickelodeon. In 2001, the company founded Ka-Chew!, a live-action commercial division.

The company was also active in producing recorded music with the record labels Tone Casualties and Casual Tonalities. Gabor Csupo was a good friend of Frank Zappa and occasionally collaborates with Mark Mothersbaugh. After Duckman and Aaahh!!! Real Monsters were both cancelled in 1997, Klasky Csupo began producing The Wild Thornberrys for Nickelodeon, which premiered the following year; the story revolved around a girl named Eliza Thornberry who could talk to animals.

In 1998, Klasky Csupo produced its first feature-length film, The Rugrats Movie, which opened in the United States on November 20, 1998 as the #1 film in the country and grossed $141 million worldwide, becoming the first non-Disney animated film to gross over $100 million in the United States. It was then followed by two sequels, Rugrats in Paris: The Movie (2000) and Rugrats Go Wild (2003), the latter of which was a crossover with The Wild Thornberrys. The Wild Thornberrys later got its own feature-length film in 2002.

That same year, Klasky Csupo was commissioned by McDonald's to develop The Wacky Adventures of Ronald McDonald, a series of six animated videos featuring the company's mascot, Ronald McDonald, which were distributed directly to consumers via participating McDonald's restaurants on VHS. On December 23, 1998, CEO Terry Thoren concluded an eleven-month negotiation with the car industry Mercedes-Benz and moved the company into the state-of-the-art studio in Los Angeles.

In the late 1990s and early 2000s, Klasky Csupo began producing two more shows for Nickelodeon: Rocket Power and As Told by Ginger. They also produced Stressed Eric - BBC Two's first adult-oriented production.

In 2001, in honor of the tenth anniversary of Rugrats, Klasky Csupo released a two-part television special entitled All Growed Up, which featured all of the titular babies as preteens. It was popular enough that Nick commissioned a series based on that special, titled All Grown Up!, which ran on the channel from 2003 to 2008. On September 29, 2001, Class-Key Chew-Po signed animation director Chris Prynoski and his company Titmouse, Inc. for commercial representation.

In 2003, Klasky Csupo was commissioned by Cartoon Network to produce a music video by the band They Might Be Giants for their song "Dee Dee and Dexter", which features characters from Dexter's Laboratory drawn by the studio in anime style. Class-Key Chew-Po Animated Commercials and Broadcast Design were then folded into Ka-Chew! the following year.

Also in 2003, the studio began work on The Way the Dead Love, a theatrical film that was set to adapt seven short stories from German-American writer Charles Bukowski from a script penned by Bruce Wagner. The film was developed under the studio's Global Tantrum division, with Winchester Films being tapped to co-produce the film with the studio, as well as providing sales for the film. It was to be directed by Igor Kovalyov and Laslo Nosek, with names like Radiohead and Peter Gabriel being attached to compose the feature. Slated for a 2006 release, the year came and went without it. The project was then revived that same year at Warner Independent Pictures, with Johnny Depp being attached to co-produce and serve as the voice of the film's main character. Once again, the project was silently scrapped. Had it been completed, the film would have been the first R-rated feature from the studio.

In 2005, the company again worked for Cartoon Network on the shorts Oogloo + Anju, Food Court Diaries, and The Topside Rag for Sunday Pants under Ka-Chew!.

2006–2011: Decline
In the mid-2000s, Klasky Csupo ceased production on their Nickelodeon shows, as Nickelodeon executives became tired of the studio's style of animation and soon ended their long-running partnership. In 2006, the longtime CEO of the company, Terry Thoren, left the studio and they dissolved the remainder of their 401(k) program, leading them to a period of dormancy and inactivity.

In fall 2006, Klasky Csupo announced the development of 28 new animated cartoon pilots that were to be up for sale at a later date. Each pilot was animated in different designs, instead of the typical style the studio was famous for. As of 2010, some of the cartoons had yet to be finished. Gabor Csupo would later post the remains of the cartoons on his YouTube channel. One of the pilots, Chicken Town, was picked up as a series by French company Ellipsanime, though Klasky Csupo was not involved with it.

In 2007, Paul Demeyer left Klasky Csupo to found Wild Canary, taking some of Ka-Chew!'s clients with him. In 2008, Ka-Chew! celebrated its 10th anniversary by expanding its roster of directors before being absorbed into 6 Point Media in April 2011. In the same year, the studio released its final film to date, Immigrants, which was originally produced as an unaired animated series for Spike TV.

2012–present: Return of the company with new projects
In 2012, Arlene Klasky and Gabor Csupo reopened the company after nearly four years of dormancy. Along with Craig Singer, the studio created its first new project in four years, Ollie Mongo, a digital comic book about a teenage skateboarding zombie who lives 200 years in the future. In 2015, the company announced that they were working on RoboSplaat!, a web series featuring the character with a robotic voice from their 1998 on-screen logo, given the name "Splaat" (currently voiced by Greg Cipes). The logo featuring him was retired in 2008, but was revived in 2021 along with the premiere of the Rugrats revival; the logo continues to appear on productions from the company. The web series premiered on December 21, 2016 and an app based on the web series is also currently in development. That same year, Klasky Csupo also announced that they were working on some "top secret projects".

On September 2, 2015, it was announced that Nickelodeon may "seek to experiment with retooled versions of classics" that could include Rugrats. The following day, The Independent announced that Rugrats "could soon be back on our screens too". At San Diego Comic-Con in 2016, Arlene Klasky explained that she would be willing to work on a revival of the series along with co-creators Gábor Csupó and Paul Germain.

On July 16, 2018, Nickelodeon announced a revival/reboot of Rugrats consisting of a 26-episode order. Arlene Klasky and Gábor Csupó would return as executive producers for the revived series. Using CGI animation rather than traditional hand-drawn animation used in the original series, the new Rugrats premiered on Paramount+, the streaming service for Nickelodeon parent Paramount Global, on May 27, 2021.

In April 2022, Gabor Csupo launched an NFT project titled Cosa Monstra.

 RoboSplaat! RoboSplaat! is an American Flash animated web series created by Arlene Klasky for YouTube. The series is about Splaat, an ink splat, who is voiced by Greg Cipes, who also voiced Beast Boy from Teen Titans and Teen Titans Go!.

 RoboSplaat! characters 
 Splaat 
 Splaat (voiced by Greg Cipes) is the main character in the series. He is a purple ink splat with two weird yellow rectangles, the upper has blue eyes, while the lower has a mouth with red lips. He wears black long sleeves and red and white sneakers, each with a white shoelace tied. He also appeared in the Klasky Csupo logo, albeit with no limbs, a more realistic look, a robotic voice, and his ink splat is black on a blue background. Prior to 2012, his name was the robot.

 Splaat's family 
 Digital (voiced by Debi Derryberry) is Splaat's 12-year-old/younger brother. Unlike Splaat, the rectangles are red instead of yellow, his lips are blue instead of red, and wears a black short-sleeved shirt with a white sound shape and grey and white shoes, each with a black shoelace tied.
 Sergei (voiced by Cooper Barnes) is the father of Splaat and Digital and the husband of Blossom. He is an ink bottle with sea-green eyes and pink lips. He wears purplish black armless sleeves and black shoes.
 Blossom (voiced by Candi Milo) is the mother of Splaat and Digital, the wife of Sergey, and the only female and legless member of Splaat's family. She is a pair of blue scissors with blue eyes and a weird yellow rectangle that has a mouth with red lips. She wears an orange skirt and gloves.
 Grandpa''' (voiced by Richard Tanner) is the grandfather of Splaat and Digital and the father of Sergei. He is a grey ink splat with blue eyes and black eyebrows and wears green glasses, a black suit with a green shirt and a purple necktie, and brown shoes.

Filmography

 Television series 

Web series

Films

 Pilots 

Other projects

Commercials

1-800-COLLECT (1994)
ABC (1987)
ABC Family (2003, 2005)
Acclaim Entertainment (1991, 1993)
Aflac
AirTouch (1990s)
American Electric Power (2009)
Anheuser-Busch (PSA; 1990s)
Aquapod (2006)
Animax (2000)
ArcLight Cinemas
Bandai (2009)
Boddingtons Brewery (1999)
BrawnyBridezillas (2006)
Budweiser (2001)
Burger King (1990, 1998, 2004)
Butterfinger (1988, 1991)
California State Lottery (1990s)
Callaway Golf Company
Campbell Soup Company (2004-2007)
CareerBuilder (2008)
Cartoon Network (Hi Hi Puffy AmiYumi promo)
CBS (1990s)
Central DuPage Hospital
Chicago Tribune (late 1990s)
Children's Health
Chili's (1995)
Chuck E. Cheese's (1997-2008)
Cinnamon Toast Crunch (1990s)
Clearasil (1994)
The Coca-Cola Company (1988, 1995)
Cocoa Pebbles (1999)
Cocoa Puffs (1995, 2000)
Disney Channel (Herbie: Fully Loaded ID; 2005)
DoubleTree (1990s)
E! (Herbie: Fully Loaded ID; 2005)
EarthLink (2000)
Easton (2004)
Eggland's Best (mid-1990s)
Eggo Waf-Fulls (2002)Entertainment This Week (1988)
ESPN
Farmers Insurance (1990s)
First Hawaiian Bank (1990s)
Fox Video (1995)
Fuel TV (2006)
Fun Cuisine (2006)
G4
Go-Gurt (2008)
Goldfish (2005-2006)
Hallmark Cards (2005)
Head and Shoulders (1999)
The Hershey Company (1990s)
Hertz (2008)
Hilton Hotels (1990s)
Hasbro (1999-2000)
Honda (2000)
Jell-O (1990s)
Joy (2004)
Kashi
KCOP (1982)
Keebler (2004)
Kidz Bop (2005-2008)
Kmart (1982)
Kraft Foods (1997, 2004)
Lakeshore Entertainment (1997)
Lands' End
Levi's 501
Lipton
Lunchables (1995-1996)
LunchMakers (1997)
M&M's (2003)
Mattel (1990s, 2003, 2005)
Mazda (1990s)
McDonald's (1997-1999, 2009)
Mentos (2004)
Mercury Villager (1998)
MGA Entertainment (2002-2004, 2007)
MGM/UA ("Action '88" showreel; 1988)
Milky Way (1990s)
Milton Bradley (1990s)
Mimi's Cafe
Minute Maid (2004)
Mississippi State Department of Health (2006)
The Movie Channel (1993)
Mucinex (2004-2007)
Mylan EpiPen
Nabisco (2000)
National Amusements (1995)
NBC (1990)
Newport Beach Film Festival (2006)
Nickelodeon (1999-2000, 2005–2007)
Nicktoons (2003)
Noggin (1999)
Pop Tarts Pastry Swirls (2000)
Powerade (1990s)
Proximus (2009)
Radio Disney (2005)
Radio Vision (1989)
Red Vines (2009)
Rose Laser Medical Center (1989)
Samsung Telecommunications (2008)
San Diego Wild Animal Park (2000)
SeaWorld (1990s)
Sega (1990s)
Shoe Carnival (2009)
Six Flags Magic Mountain (1990s)
Sony Digital (1994)
Spike TV
Sun Tan City
Sweet Peppers Deli (2008)
Taco Bell (1995-1996)
Tiger Electronics (1999)
TNT Wild World of Shorts (1991)
Tombstone Pizza (early 2000s)
Toyota (2007)
Toyota Grand Prix of Long Beach (1990)
United States Postal Service (training film; mid-1990s)
Urban Outfitters (2006)Wheel of Fortune'' (1991)
WSRB
Zapf Creation (2007)

See also 
 Nickelodeon Animation Studio
 Film Roman

References

External links 
 
 Klasky Csupo at the Big Cartoon DataBase
 Nick Animation Podcast, Episode 4: Arlene Klasky (Hector Navarro, moderator). Published June 3, 2016; listened June 4, 2016.

 
American companies established in 1982
Mass media companies established in 1982
American animation studios
Companies based in Los Angeles
Companies established in 1982
1982 establishments in California
Film and television memes
Entertainment companies established in 1982
Graphic design studios
Adult animation studios
Internet memes

sah:Klasky Csupo